Night Stalker is an unusual funny car.

Built by Jack Chrisman in 1971, the Mustang was a "sidewinder"—that is, the engine was mounted transversely in the chassis.

Night Stalker was the first funny car John Force ever drove.

Notes

Sources
 Taylor, Thom.  "Beauty Beyond the Twilight Zone" in Hot Rod, April 2017, pp. 30–43.

1970s cars
Drag racing cars
Rear-wheel-drive vehicles